KMKO-FM (95.7 FM) is an American radio station licensed to serve the community of Lake Crystal, Minnesota, broadcasting to the Mankato area and the Minnesota River Valley. The station airs an active rock format.

The station is rebroadcast in Mankato on translator K269EC 101.7 FM, which provides a stronger signal in the downtown area.

History
The station went on the air as KQYK on September 29, 2005, with a country format as "The Eagle". On September 26, 2007, the station flipped to active rock as "95.7 The Blaze," with a format and logo similar to that of sister station KIBZ in Lincoln, Nebraska. On February 1, 2012, KQYK changed their call sign to KMKO-FM. On February 20, 2012, at 11am, KMKO-FM switched to a news/talk format, as Fake It by Seether faded into The Jim Rome Show. The station flipped back to Active Rock as "95-7 The Rock Station" on December 6, 2012.

KMKO-FM is owned by Alpha Media (Digity, LLC), through licensee Digity 3E License, LLC, with sister stations KEEZ, KYSM-FM and KRBI-FM.

As of 2018 KMKO-FM has rebranded as “Rock 95” with no change in format.

Previous logos

References

External links

Radio stations in Minnesota
Radio stations established in 2005
2005 establishments in Minnesota